South Monrovia Island is a census-designated place in Los Angeles County, California. It is bounded to the west and north by Monrovia, to the east by Duarte, and to the south by Irwindale. The 2010 United States census reported that South Monrovia Island's population was 6,777.

Geography
According to the United States Census Bureau, the CDP has a total area of 0.5 square miles (1.4 km), all of which is land.

Demographics
At the 2010 census South Monrovia Island had a population of 6,777. The racial makeup of South Monrovia Island was 3,433 (50.7%) White (10.9% Non-Hispanic White), 570 (8.4%) African American, 49 (0.7%) Native American, 418 (6.2%) Asian, 9 (0.1%) Pacific Islander, 2,003 (29.6%) from other races, and 295 (4.4%) from two or more races. Hispanic or Latino of any race were 5,013 persons (74.0%).

The census reported that 6,620 people (97.7% of the population) lived in households, 9 (0.1%) lived in non-institutionalized group quarters, and 148 (2.2%) were institutionalized.

There were 1,551 households, 857 (55.3%) had children under the age of 18 living in them, 907 (58.5%) were opposite-sex married couples living together, 271 (17.5%) had a female householder with no husband present, 142 (9.2%) had a male householder with no wife present.  There were 92 (5.9%) unmarried opposite-sex partnerships, and 7 (0.5%) same-sex married couples or partnerships. 179 households (11.5%) were one person and 84 (5.4%) had someone living alone who was 65 or older. The average household size was 4.27.  There were 1,320 families (85.1% of households); the average family size was 4.39.

The age distribution was 1,937 people (28.6%) under the age of 18, 772 people (11.4%) aged 18 to 24, 1,945 people (28.7%) aged 25 to 44, 1,574 people (23.2%) aged 45 to 64, and 549 people (8.1%) who were 65 or older.  The median age was 32.0 years. For every 100 females, there were 99.2 males.  For every 100 females age 18 and over, there were 99.5 males.

There were 1,613 housing units at an average density of 2,944.7 per square mile, of the occupied units 1,151 (74.2%) were owner-occupied and 400 (25.8%) were rented. The homeowner vacancy rate was 2.1%; the rental vacancy rate was 2.2%.  4,835 people (71.3% of the population) lived in owner-occupied housing units and 1,785 people (26.3%) lived in rental housing units.

According to the 2010 United States Census, South Monrovia Island had a median household income of $52,936, with 16.1% of the population living below the federal poverty line.

References

Census-designated places in Los Angeles County, California
Census-designated places in California